Wildmill railway station is a railway station serving the district of Wildmill, Bridgend, South Wales. It located on the Maesteg Line from Cardiff via Bridgend.

History
The station was opened by British Rail on 16 November 1992 but closed four hours after it opened due to the station shelter being one inch too close to the platform edge.

It was reopened nearly four weeks later, on 12 December 1992.

Service
Passenger services are operated by Transport for Wales Rail as part of the Valley Lines network for local services.

References

External links

Railway stations in Bridgend County Borough
DfT Category F2 stations
Railway stations opened by British Rail
Railway stations in Great Britain opened in 1992
Railway stations in Great Britain closed in 1992
Railway stations served by Transport for Wales Rail